Ricardo Manuel Cardoso Martins (born 24 January 1990) is a professional footballer who plays for Estudiantes de Mérida F.C. as a midfielder.

References

External links

1990 births
Living people
People from Puerto la Cruz
Venezuelan people of Portuguese descent
Citizens of Portugal through descent
Association football midfielders
Portuguese footballers
Venezuelan footballers
Liga Portugal 2 players
Segunda Divisão players
Rio Ave F.C. players
Gondomar S.C. players
G.D. Ribeirão players
C.D. Aves players
F.C. Famalicão players
Venezuelan Primera División players
Deportivo Anzoátegui players
Caracas FC players
Atlético Venezuela C.F. players
Estudiantes de Mérida players
Portugal youth international footballers
Portugal under-21 international footballers